The following is a list of fictional works with military robots.

Film

Near future 
Land design
Kill Command (2016) – S.A.R
Fahrenheit 451 (1953) – Mechanical hound
Red Planet (2000) – AMEE (Autonomous Mapping Exploration and Evasion)
Lara Croft: Tomb Raider (2001) – S.I.M.O.N.
RoboCop (1987) – ED-209 (Enforcement Droid Series 209)
Terminator 3: Rise of the Machines (2003) – T-1 Battlefield Robot
Short Circuit (1986) – Nova S-A-I-N-T (Strategic-Artificially-Intelligent-Nuclear-Transport) "Johnny 5"
Hardware (1990) – M.A.R.K. 13 prototype killer combat droid
Air Models
Stealth (2005) – EDI (Extreme Deep Invader)
Terminator 3: Rise of the Machines (2003) – T-1 airborne VTOL craft

High futurist 
Humanoids
Terminator series (1984/1991/2003) – Cyberdyne T-800/T-850 Terminator Endoskeleton
Star Wars Episodes I, II, III (1999/2002/2005) – Eos B-1 Battle Droid
Star Wars Episodes II, III (2002/2005) – Eos B-2 Super Battle Droid 
Star Wars Episode III (2005) – Holowan IG-100 MagnaGuards
Transformers (2007) – Decepticons
Saturn 3 (1980) – "Hector" Model
The Black Hole (1979) – S.T.A.R. (Special Troops/Arms Regiment)
Battlestar Galactica (1978) – Cylon Centurion (Military androids with silver armor)
Fallout (series) (2008) – Protectron (security robot), Mister Gutsy (armed variant of domestic servant robot), Sentry Bot (military combat robot), Liberty Prime (near-
Aliens  (1986) – (Aliens)  Lance Bishop  Hyperdyne Systems model 341-B Synthetic 

indestructible battle robot)

Androids
Terminator series (1984/1991/2003) – Cyberdyne T-800 (Series 800, Model 101, Version 2.4)
Terminator 2: Judgment Day – Cyberdyne T-1000 a shape-shifter android assassin
Terminator 3: Rise of the Machines (2003) – T-X "Terminatrix"
Fallout (series) (2008) – Synth (generations 1–3) self-aware synthetic humans (a bodyguard and a headhunter is featured) and Brainbots (controlled by an organic brain)

Other designs
The Matrix series (1999/2003) – Sentinels
Lost in Space (1998) – B9 "Robot"
Star Wars Episodes I, II, III (1999/2002/2005) – Droideka (Destroyer Droid)

Star Wars series (1977/2005) – R2-D2 (Astromech droid)
The Black Hole (1979) – V.I.N.CENT (Vital Information Necessary CENTralized)
The Black Hole (1979) – B.O.B. (BiO-sanitation Battalion)
The Black Hole (1979) – Maximilian
Fallout series (1997–2010) – General Atomics International "Mister Gutsy" combat droids, among others
Halo 1, 2, and 3 (2001–2007) – Sentinels, and Super Sentinels
Screamers (1995) – Screamers

Powered Exoskeletons
 The Matrix Revolutions (2003) – APU (Armored Personnel Unit)
 Iron Man (2008) – Iron Man Suit (Powered exoskeleton)
 Avatar (2009 film) (2009) – AMP (Amplified Mobility Platform)
 M.A.N.T.I.S. (1994) – M.A.N.T.I.S. (Mechanically Augmented Neuro-Transmitter Interactive System)
 District 9 (2009) – Bio-Suit (Bio-mechanical powered exoskeleton)
 Fallout series (1997–present) – T-45d and T-51b Powered Infantry Armor (the former's MP-47/A prototype variant even has a basic AI)

Television
Battlestar Galactica
Buck Rogers
Robotica 
24
Stargate SG-1
Stargate Atlantis
Terminator: The Sarah Connor Chronicles
Doctor Who (List of Doctor Who robots)

Literature
Various books by Isaac AsimovShooting War by Anthony Lappé
The Bolo stories of Keith Laumer and others.Starship Troopers by Robert A. Heinlein
Various Dale Brown books
The Cybernetic Infantry Device manned robot and Tin Man robotic battle armor.

Computer/video gamesA.I. Wars (The Insect Mind) and (Armor Commander)Apex LegendsArmed and DangerousBioShock (series)Call of Duty: Black Ops IICall of Duty: Black Ops IIICall of Duty: Infinite WarfareCommand & Conquer 3: Tiberium WarsCommand & Conquer: Generals and Command & Conquer: Generals – Zero HourCommand & Conquer: Red Alert 2 and Command & Conquer: Yuri's RevengeCommand & Conquer: Red Alert 3Deus Ex and Deus Ex: Invisible WarEarthsiege 2Empire EarthEmpire Earth IIFallout (series)Metal GearOverwatchPortalRatchet & ClankStarsiegeSupreme CommanderTiny TankTitanfall and Titanfall 2Trails (series)Unreal Tournament and Unreal Tournament 2004MessiahZStarCraftBattletechHorizon Zero DawnGirls' Frontline'' 

-
 
Robots